Neil Sedaka: 14 Knockouts is a West German-produced compilation album containing the works of American pop star Neil Sedaka. It was released in 1977 on the RCA International label.

Track listing

Side One
 (1) I Go Ape (1959)
 (2) Bad Girl (1963)
 (3) The Dreamer (1963)
 (4) Forty Winks Away (1960)
 (5) Stupid Cupid (1959)
 (6) Moon Of Gold (1959)
 (7) Going Home To Mary Lou (1959)

Side Two
 (8) You're Knocking Me Out (1959)
 (9) The Diary (1958)
 (10) Let's Go Steady Again (1963)
 (11) I Belong To You (1959)
 (12) Too Late (1963)
 (13) I Hope He Breaks Your Heart (1964)
 (14) Sunny (1964)

References
Neil Sedaka: 14 Knockouts

Neil Sedaka compilation albums
1977 compilation albums